Nathuahat is a village in Jalpaiguri District in the state of West Bengal, India. It is located along the foothill regions of the Himalayas. The Longitude and Latitude of this village is 26.7145° N, 88.9043° E. The Daina River flows along the western margin of the village, and the Jaldhaka and Rangati rivers also course through the village. This village is 57 KM away from its District Town. Nearest Railway Station is Dhupguri Railway Station which is 20 KM away. One of the key attraction of this village is Tea Garden. Jaldhaka Altadanga Tea Estate is the name of the factory which is established at around 1985.  This has three higher secondary school along with one ITI college named as Dhupguri ITI College.

References

Cities and towns in Jalpaiguri district